Julian Nunamaker (February 13, 1946 – February 25, 1995) was an American football defensive end and defensive tackle. He played for the Buffalo Bills from 1969 to 1971. On February 18, 1995, he was involved in a car accident, dying a week later from his injuries.

References

1946 births
1995 deaths
American football defensive ends
American football defensive tackles
UT Martin Skyhawks football players
Buffalo Bills players